is a Japanese actress. She has appeared in a number of Japanese TV dramas and films.

In 2010, she appeared in Aparna Sen's Bengali Film The Japanese Wife as the leading female opposite Rahul Bose.

Television
 The Great Horror Family (2004)
 Taiga drama Yoshitsune (2005)
  GoGo Sentai Boukenger (2006)
 Hanayome wa Yakudoshi! (2006)
 Mop Girl (2007)
 Je t'aime Watashi wa Kemono (2008)
 Samurai Code (2010)
 Zettai Reido (2010)
 Shokuzai (2012)

Films
 Chikatetsu ni Notte (2006)
 Summer Wars (2009) as Nana Jinnouchi (voice)
 The Japanese Wife (2010) as Miyage

References

External links
 
Official Profile 
Chigusa Takaku Official Blog 
Ameba blog 

1978 births
Living people
Actresses from Tokyo
Japanese film actresses
Japanese expatriates in India
Expatriate actresses in India
Actresses in Bengali cinema